Shibata Station is the name of multiple train stations in Japan.

 Shibata Station (Aichi) - (柴田駅) in Aichi Prefecture
 Shibata Station (Niigata) - (新発田駅) in Niigata Prefecture